Georgia competed at the 2012 Summer Olympics in London, from 27 July to 12 August 2012. This was a list of results of all athletes who qualified for the Olympics and were nominated by the Georgian National Olympic Committee. A total of 35 athletes, 29 men and 6 women, competed in 11 sports, tying the record for the most athletes with Beijing. Among the sports played by the athletes, Georgia marked its Olympic debut in tennis.

The Georgian team included three bronze medalists from the previous games: pistol shooter Nino Salukvadze, and freestyle wrestlers Otar Tushishvili and Giorgi Gogshelidze. Among these champions, Gogshelidze only managed to repeat his bronze medal in men's freestyle wrestling. Salukvadze, gold medalist in pistol shooting at the 1988 Summer Olympics in Seoul, participated in her seventh Olympic games under three different banners (the other two were Soviet Union and the Unified Team), and was the oldest and most experienced member of the contingent, at age 45. The Georgian National Olympic Committee also appointed her to be the nation's flag bearer at the opening ceremony.

Georgia left London with a total of 7 medals (1 gold, 3 silver, and 3 bronze). Judoka Lasha Shavdatuashvili won the nation's only gold medal on the second day of the competition. Five other medals won by the Georgian athletes were awarded in freestyle and Greco-Roman wrestling. After the games, Weightlifter Rauli Tsirekidze and Wrestler Davit Modzmanashvili both tested positive for banned substances and were disqualified with Modzmanashvili being stripped of his silver medal

Medalists

| width="78%" align="left" valign="top" |

| width="22%" align="left" valign="top" |

Archery

Georgia has qualified one archer for the women's individual event.

Athletics

Key
 Note – Ranks given for track events are within the athlete's heat only
 Q = Qualified for the next round
 q = Qualified for the next round as a fastest loser or, in field events, by position without achieving the qualifying target
 NR = National record
 N/A = Round not applicable for the event
 Bye = Athlete not required to compete in round

Men
Track & road events

Field events

Women
Field events

Boxing

Georgia has qualified one boxer.

Men

Cycling

Road

Gymnastics

Trampoline

Judo

Men

Shooting

Georgia has ensured a berth in the shooting's 10m air pistol women event.

Women

Swimming

Georgia has gained a "Universality place" from the FINA.

Men

Tennis

Weightlifting

Georgia has qualified 3 men.

Wrestling

Georgia has qualified 13 quota places.

Key
  - Victory by Fall.
  - Decision by Points - the loser with technical points.
  - Decision by Points - the loser without technical points.

Men's freestyle

Men's Greco-Roman

See also
Georgia at the 2012 Winter Youth Olympics

References

Summer Olympics
Nations at the 2012 Summer Olympics
2012